The Opel Regent is a luxury car from the German carmaker Opel introduced in November 1928 and available as a four-door limousine and two-door coupe.  The official name was Opel 24/110 (24 Steuer-PS/110 PS nominal).

The Regent is notable for being Opel's most luxurious vehicle and competed with the likes of Rolls-Royce, Bugatti, and Mercedes-Benz.

In March 1929, General Motors bought 80% of the share capital of Adam Opel AG. Since GM feared too much competition with the top models of its own brands Cadillac and Buick, the Regent was discontinued. GM purchased back all models that had been purchased and scrapped them in an event described as unique by various automotive historians. This means that no Regent has survived.

The name Regent was later used for the luxury versions of the 1932 Opel Regent 1.8 Litre. However, the Opel Regent 1.8 Litre was much smaller and less powerful than the original Regent and was never seen as its true successor.

References

 Marcus Schneider: Deutsche Automobile. Edition XXL, Fränkisch-Crumbach 2005, S. 274 (German)

External links
 Opel Specials (German Website)
 Carsablanca (German Website)

Regent
Cars introduced in 1928
Luxury vehicles